Special Blends Volume 1 & 2 is a 2-CD set, remix album released by Daniel Dumile under the Metal Fingers moniker on his Metal Face Records label. Each track is a remix of famous hip hop songs by other MCs and rappers remixed to instrumentals from Dumile's early Special Herbs albums. Mixed by DOOM himself, this collection incorporates vocals from a wide range of iconic records.

The album was reissued on vinyl on June 17, 2016 on Metalface Records in standard 2XLP vinyl format, as well as a deluxe version inside a custom-printed burlap bag.

Track listing

All tracks are produced by Metal Fingers.

Disc 1 (Vol. 1)
 "Pounds Up (MF Doom Special Blend)" - 3:43
 M.O.P.
 Contains "Red #40" from Special Herbs, Vol. 2
 "Off the Books/Just To Get A Rep (MF Doom Special Blend)" - 3:31
 Beatnuts, Gangstarr featuring Big Pun and Cuban Link
 Contains "Nettle Leaves" from Special Herbs, Vol. 2
 "Mighty Healthy/That's Me (MF Doom Special Blend)" - 4:41
 Ghostface Killah, Cam'ron
 Contains "Mullein" from Special Herbs, Vol. 2
 "You're Playing Yourself (MF Doom Special Blend)" - 2:43
 Jeru The Damaja
 Contains "Mugwort" from Special Herbs, Vol. 2
 "Latoya (MF Doom Special Blend)" - 2:52
 Just-Ice
 Contains "All Spice" from Special Herbs, Vol. 2
 "On and On (MF Doom Special Blend)" - 3:58
 Erykah Badu
 Contains "Lovage" from Special Herbs, Vol. 2
 "Top Billin' (MF Doom Special Blend)" - 1:58
 Audio Two
 Contains "Eucalyptus" from Special Herbs, Vol. 2
 "Shook Ones (MF Doom Special Blend)" - 3:26
 Mobb Deep 
 Contains "Saffron" from Special Herbs, Vol. 1
 "One Love (MF Doom Special Blend)" - 3:51 
 Nas
 Contains "Arrow Root" from Special Herbs, Vol. 1
 "Brown Sugar (MF Doom Special Blend)" - 3:20
 D'Angelo
 Contains "Zatar" from Special Herbs, Vol. 1
 "Ante Up (MF Doom Special Blend)" - 3:26
 M.O.P.
 Contains "Fenugreek" from Special Herbs, Vol. 1
 "Stakes Is High (MF Doom Special Blend)" - 1:59
 De La Soul
 Contains "Sumac Berries" from Special Herbs, Vol. 1
 "Paper Thin (MF Doom Special Blend)" - 2:10
 MC Lyte
 Contains "Shallots" from Special Herbs, Vol. 1
 "Criminology (MF Doom Special Blend)" - 2:24 
 Raekwon featuring Ghostface Killah
 Contains "Charnsuka" from Special Herbs, Vol. 1
 "Bring The Noise (MF Doom Special Blend)" - 1:35
 Public Enemy featuring Anthrax
 Contains "Monosodium Glutimate" from Special Herbs, Vol. 1

Disc 2 (Vol. 2)

 "Hustlin' (MF Doom Special Blend)" - 2:10 
 Smoothe Da Hustler featuring Rhyme Recca, and Trigga tha Gambler
 Contains "Agrimony" from Special Herbs, Vol. 3
 "Shit's Real/Stick To Ya Gunz (MF Doom Special Blend)" - 6:18  
 Mic Geronimo and M.O.P. featuring Kool G Rap
 Contains "Benzoin Gum" and "Bergamot Wild" from Special Herbs, Vol. 3
 "Mad Sick (MF Doom Special Blend)" - 3:52  
 Now Born Click
 Contains "Calamus Root" from Special Herbs, Vol. 3
 "The Glock (MF Doom Special Blend)" - 3:41 
 Lil Vicious
 Contains "Dragon's Blood Resin" from Special Herbs, Vol. 3
 "We Run Things (MF Doom Special Blend)" - 2:47
 Da Bush Babees
 Contains "Elder Blossoms" from Special Herbs, Vol. 3
 "Hell On Earth (MF Doom Special Blend)" - 2:35  
 Mobb Deep
 Contains "Styrax Gum" from Special Herbs, Vol. 3
 "Slingin' Bass (MF Doom Special Blend)" - 3:38
 Grand Daddy I.U.
 Contains "Pennyroyal" and "Lavender Buds" from Special Herbs, Vols. 5 & 6
 "Method Man (MF Doom Special Blend)" - 2:17
 Method Man
 Contains "White Willow Bark" from Special Herbs, Vols. 5 & 6
 "Hazy Shade Of Criminal (MF Doom Special Blend)" - 2:01  
 Public Enemy
 Contains "Orange Blossoms" from Special Herbs, Vols. 5 & 6
 "Ryde Or Die (MF Doom Special Blend)" - 3:06
 Ruff Ryders
 Contains "Coffin Nails" from Special Herbs, Vols. 5 & 6
 "(You're Puttin') A Rush On Me (MF Doom Special Blend)" - 4:07
 Stephanie Mills
 Contains "Kava Kava Root" from Special Herbs, Vols. 5 & 6
 "Get Your Roll On (MF Doom Special Blend)" - 4:52  
 Big Tymers
 Contains "Valerian Root" from Special Herbs, Vols. 5 & 6

References

2004 remix albums
MF Doom albums